Sailing/Yachting is an Olympic sport starting from the Games of the 1st Olympiad (1896 Olympics in Athens, Greece). With the exception of 1904 and the canceled 1916 Summer Olympics, sailing has always been included on the Olympic schedule.
The Sailing program of 1920 was open for a total of sixteen sailing classes (disciplines), but actually only fourteen Sailing events were contested, because of at the 8.5 metre and 9 metre classes there were no entrants. For each class three races were scheduled from 7 July 1920 to 10 July 1920 off the coast of Ostend at the North Sea.

Venue

Royal Yacht Club of Belgium 
Ostend offers a fair condition for sailing on the North Sea. Though there are tidal conditions, the current is reasonable predictable. Local knowledge does not have too much influence of the races. The wind conditions are also good for sailing. However, in the case of the 1920 Summer Olympic regatta's the prevailing breeze did not show. Most races had to be sailed under light air conditions.

An unprecedented and unique Olympic situation happened with the races in the 12' Dinghy. When in the second race one of the marks was taken hostage by the tidal current and went drifting the race had to be nullified. Since the organizers did not have the time to resail the race and both teams were of Dutch origin the Belgian organization requested the Dutch Olympic Committee to resail the finals in The Netherlands. As a result, the first Olympic event held in the Netherlands was not in 1928 but already in 1920. As venue of this final the Buiten IJ in Amsterdam was chosen.

Course areas

Competition

Overview 

A maximum of 2 boats per country per class was allowed.

Continents

Countries 
Source:

Classes (equipment) 
Source:
The Olympic Sailing event of 1920 was without any doubt the most strangest in history so far. With a program of no less than 16 classes and an entry list that consists of 7 out of 14 classes with just competitor and only one class with more than 3 yachts.

After World War I the International Sailing Authority had obvious no clue in what direction sailing had developed since 1912. The Nordic countries had developed the Skerry Cruiser classes and the International rule classes had adopted in 1919 a new edition of the rule which was not yet implemented in the countries. Therefore, the entries were open for the old, as well the new rule and two Skerry classes. Besides that, an advice from 1908 was followed by putting two one design classes on the program. By doing this the 1920 Olympics acted as a test laboratory from which the IYRU could draw conclusion for the further development of the sport. These lessons learned, not too many different classes and moving towards one design classes, did show during the next Olympic Sailing event and are still taken into account.

{|class="wikitable" style="text-align:center"
  |-
  |colspan="7"|
    
  |-
  ! Class !! Type !! Venue !! Event !! Sailors !! First OG !! Olympics so far
  |-
  |style="text-align:left"|12' Dinghy                    ||Dinghy  ||Ostend ||||2      ||1920|| 1
  |-
  |style="text-align:left"|18' Dinghy                    ||Dinghy||Ostend ||||2      ||1920|| 1
  |-
  |style="text-align:left"|6.5 Metre               ||Keelboat    ||Ostend ||||3      ||1920|| 1
  |-
  |style="text-align:left"|8.5 Metre               ||Keelboat    ||No show||||Unknown||1920|| 0
  |-
  |style="text-align:left"|6 Metre (2x)              ||Keelboat    ||Ostend ||||3      ||1908|| 3
  |-
  |style="text-align:left"|7 Metre                   ||Keelboat    ||Ostend ||||2      ||1908|| 2
  |-
  |style="text-align:left"|8 Metre (2x)              ||Keelboat    ||Ostend ||||5      ||1908|| 3
  |-
  |style="text-align:left"|9 Metre                   ||Keelboat    ||No show||||Unknown||1920|| 0
  |-
  |style="text-align:left"|10 Metre (2x)            ||Keelboat    ||Ostend ||||8      ||1912|| 2
  |-
  |style="text-align:left"|12 Metre (2x)                 ||Keelboat    ||Ostend ||||9      ||1908|| 3
  |-
  |style="text-align:left"|30m2 Skerry Cruiser||Keelboat    ||Ostend ||||7      ||1920|| 1
  |-
  |style="text-align:left"|40m2 Skerry Cruiser||Keelboat    ||Ostend ||||8      ||1920|| 1
  |-
  |colspan="7"|'Legend:  = Mixed gender event
  |-
  |colspan="7"|
  
|}

 Race schedule 

 Medal summary 
Source:

 Medal table 

 Other information 

 Sailing 
 The agony athletes develop after finishing fourth at the Olympics must have started at the Olympic Sailing event of 1920. The Belgium 6 Metre team of Louis Depiere, Raymond Bauwens and Willy Valcke finished 4th and became the only'' sailing team at the 1920 Olympics that went home without a medal.
 In the Sailing regattas, Norway took 7 gold medals. This boost put them in the higher regions of the medal table. They still profit from this boost.

Sailors 
During the Sailing regattas at the 1920 Summer Olympics among others the following persons were competing in the various classes:

Further reading

References 

 
1920 Summer Olympics events
1920
1920 in sailing
Sport in Ostend
Sports competitions in Amsterdam
1920 in Dutch sport
1920s in Amsterdam